Lake Ray Hubbard Transit Center is a small bus-only station located on Duck Creek Dr. west of Broadway (Belt Line Rd.) in Garland, Texas (U.S.A.). It is owned and operated by Dallas Area Rapid Transit, whose buses mostly serve Lake Ray Hubbard as well as South Garland Transit Center and Downtown Garland Station

External links
Dallas Area Rapid Transit - Lake Ray Hubbard Transit Center

Dallas Area Rapid Transit
Transportation in Garland, Texas
Bus stations in Texas